Buck Coats (born June 9, 1982) is a former Major League Baseball (MLB) outfielder.

Career
Coats was drafted in the 18th round (523rd overall) of the 2000 MLB Draft by the Chicago Cubs.

Coats made his Major League debut for the Cubs on August 22, 2006, against the Philadelphia Phillies. After the 2006 season, he finished batting .167 with one home run and one RBI.

Coats was then traded to the Reds for a player to be named later. Buck finished hitting .206 and two RBIs, a personal best. The Reds then dealt him to the Toronto Blue Jays for right-handed pitcher Justin James.

Coats only played eight games for the Toronto Blue Jays before being sent back down to the minors. He finished the season batting .200, with one hit, and a single stolen base.

Coats signed a minor league contract with the Kansas City Royals on November 25, 2009. Coats was traded to the Chicago White Sox organization and assigned to the AA Birmingham Barons on May 4, 2010. Coats hit .338 with two home runs and 8 RBI in 68 at-bats with the Barons before being promoted to the Triple-A Charlotte Knights.

On December 15, 2010, Coats signed a minor league contract with the Washington Nationals. Due to injury, he was limited to only nine games with the Double-A Harrisburg Senators, batting .261 with 3 RBI.

In 2015, Coats, along with Alexis Gómez, were named co-hitting coaches of the Orem Owlz, the minor league rookie affiliate of the Los Angeles Angels.

References

External links

Yahoo bio

1982 births
Living people
American expatriate baseball players in Canada
Arizona League Cubs players
Baseball coaches from Georgia (U.S. state)
Baseball players from Georgia (U.S. state)
Birmingham Barons players
Charlotte Knights players
Chicago Cubs players
Cincinnati Reds players
Daytona Cubs players
Harrisburg Senators players
Iowa Cubs players
Lansing Lugnuts players
Las Vegas 51s players
Los Angeles Angels scouts
Louisville Bats players
Major League Baseball center fielders
Mesa Solar Sox players
Minor league baseball coaches
Naranjeros de Hermosillo players
American expatriate baseball players in Mexico
Omaha Royals players
Syracuse Chiefs players
Tigres de Aragua players
American expatriate baseball players in Venezuela
Toronto Blue Jays players
West Tennessee Diamond Jaxx players